Nigeria is a federation of 36 states and 1 federal capital territory. Each of the 36 states is a semi-autonomous political unit that shares powers with the federal government as enumerated under the Constitution of the Federal Republic of Nigeria. The Federal Capital Territory (FCT), is the capital territory of Nigeria, and it is in this territory that the capital city of Abuja is located. The FCT is not a state but is administered by elected officials who are supervised by the federal government. Each state is subdivided into local government areas (LGAs). There are 774 local governments in Nigeria. Under the constitution, the 36 states are co-equal but not supreme because sovereignty resides with the federal government. The constitution can be amended by the National Assembly, but each amendment must be ratified by two-thirds of the 36 states of the federation.

Current states and the Federal Capital Territory

Evolution of Nigerian states

Government
States of Nigeria have the right to organize and structure their individual governments in any way within the parameters set by the Constitution of Nigeria.

Legislature
At the state level, the legislature is unicameral, with the number of its members equal to three times the number of legislators it has in the Federal House of Representatives. It has the power to legislate on matters on the concurrent list.

Executive
At the state level, the head of the executive is the governor, who has the power to appoint people to the state executive council, subject to the advice and consent of the state house of assembly (legislature). The head of a ministry at the state level is the commissioner, who is assisted by a permanent secretary, who is also a senior civil servant of the state.

Judiciary
The Judiciary is one of the co-equal arms of the state government concerned with the interpretation of the laws of the state government. The judiciary is headed by the chief justice of the state appointed by the governor subject to the approval of the state house of assembly.

Chronology

See also

List of Nigerian states by population
ISO 3166-2:NG
List of state governors of Nigeria

Notes

Sources

External links 
 
 Headline News in Nigeria  States

States And Capital In Nigeria, Their Slogans & Current Governors A comprehensive list of all states in Nigeria and their current governors.

 
Subdivisions of Nigeria
States
Nigeria 1
States, Nigeria
Nigeria geography-related lists